The women's team sabre competition in fencing at the 2016 Summer Olympics in Rio de Janeiro was held on 13 August at the Carioca Arena 3.

Schedule 
All times are Brasília time (UTC−3)

Draw

Finals

Classification 5–8

Final classification

References

Fencing at the 2016 Summer Olympics
Women's events at the 2016 Summer Olympics
2016 in women's fencing